Barney Lazarus (18 December 1879 – 6 May 1962) was an Australian rules footballer who played for the Carlton Football Club in the Victorian Football League (VFL).

Lazarus made his senior VFL debut in 1902, playing seven games for Carlton. Following his retirement from football, Lazarus moved to Sydney and married there in 1912.	In 2015 it was discovered that Lazarus was Jewish, making him one of the few Jews to have played senior VFL/AFL football.

Notes

External links 
		
Barney Lazarus's profile at Blueseum

1879 births
1962 deaths
VFL/AFL players born in England
Carlton Football Club players
Australian rules footballers from Victoria (Australia)
Jewish sportspeople
Australian Jews